Shahida Akhtar Ali is a Pakistani politician who had been a member of the National Assembly of Pakistan, from 2002 to 2007 and again from June 2013 to May 2018.

Political career

She was elected to the National Assembly of Pakistan as a candidate of Jamiat Ulema-e-Islam (F) on a reserved seat for women from Khyber Pakhtunkhwa in 2002 Pakistani general election.

She was re-elected to the National Assembly  as a candidate of Jamiat Ulema-e-Islam (F) on a reserved seat for women from Khyber Pakhtunkhwa in 2013 Pakistani general election.

References

Living people
Pashtun people
Pakistani MNAs 2013–2018
Jamiat Ulema-e-Islam (F) politicians
Pakistani MNAs 2002–2007
Women members of the National Assembly of Pakistan
Year of birth missing (living people)
21st-century Pakistani women politicians